Phavaraea poliana is a moth of the family Notodontidae first described by Herbert Druce in 1893. It is found in Brazil, Guyana and the lower Amazon.

External links
Species page at Tree of Life Web Project

Notodontidae of South America
Moths described in 1893